Abor or ABOR may refer to:

 Abor, Enugu, a town in Ojebogene L.G.A., Enugu, Nigeria 
 Abor, Ghana, a town in the Volta Region of Ghana
 Abor Hills, Arunāchal Pradesh
 Abor people (disambiguation), multiple uses
 Abor Formation, located in the Siang district, Arunachal Pradesh, India
 Academic Bill of Rights, a US campaign for certain rights for students

See also
 Abora 
 Arbor (disambiguation)